Fiebre de amor ("Fever of love") is a soundtrack album from the Mexican film of the same title. It was released in 1985 on the EMI Capitol label. Most of the tracks are performed by Luis Miguel with a few interventions from Lucerito, his girlfriend on the motion picture. The soundtrack was also recorded in Italian.

Track listing

Singles

References

Luis Miguel soundtracks
Lucero (entertainer) soundtracks
Collaborative albums
1985 soundtrack albums
EMI Records soundtracks
Spanish-language soundtracks
Musical film soundtracks
Drama film soundtracks